Taizé is the Taizé Community, a monastic order in Taizé, Saône-et-Loire, France.

Taizé may also refer to:

 Taizé, Saône-et-Loire in the Saône-et-Loire département, France
 Taizé-Aizie, in the Charente département, France
 Taizé-Maulais, in the Deux-Sèvres département, France
 Taizé - Music of Unity and Peace, a 2015 studio album by the Taizé Community
 100033 Taizé, an asteroid

See also  
 Taze (disambiguation)